1658 in philosophy

Events

Publications
 Pierre Gassendi - Syntagma philosophicum (published posthumously)

Births

Deaths
 April 7 - Juan Eusebio Nieremberg (born 1595)
 December 6 - Baltasar Gracián (born 1601)
 Kim Yuk (born 1570)

Philosophy
Early Modern philosophy
Philosophy by year